4,4′-Dihydroxybenzophenone is an organic compound with the formula (HOC6H4)2CO. This off-white solid is a precursor to, or a degradation product of, diverse commercial materials.  It is a potential endocrine disruptor.

Synthesis 
4,4′-Dihydroxybenzophenone is prepared by the rearrangement of p-hydroxyphenylbenzoate:

HOC6H4CO2C6H5  →  (HOC6H4)2CO

Alternatively, p-hydroxybenzoic acid can be converted to p-acetoxybenzoyl chloride.  This acid chloride reacts with phenol to give, after deacetylation, 4,4′-dihydroxybenzophenone.

Uses 
The main application of 4,4′-dihydroxybenzophenone is as a UV light stabilizer. It and its derivatives are found in cosmetics, plastics, films, adhesives and coatings, optical fiber, and printed circuit boards.  It is the precursor to certain polycarbonate polymers.

References 

Benzophenones
Phenols